Brandon R. Gdovic (born February 28, 1992) is an American professional racing driver. The Yorktown, Virginia resident competes in the Lamborghini Super Trofeo North America series, driving for Precision Performance Motorsports. He has also raced in the NASCAR Xfinity Series, ARCA Racing Series, NASCAR K&N Pro Series East, NASCAR Whelen Euro Series, and WeatherTech SportsCar Championship.

Racing career

ARCA Racing Series
Gdovic has two career starts in the ARCA Racing Series, running two races in 2014 for Cunningham Motorsports. He finished on the lead lap both times, and recorded an eighth-place finish at Kansas Speedway.

K&N Pro Series East
Gdovic first tried his hand at K&N Pro Series East competition in 2011, running 11 of the series 14 races. Running for his father and with funding from Aquis Communication, he scored one top five finish (New Hampshire) and three other top tens on the way to a 15th-place points finish. Gdovic failed to finish only two races.

In 2012, Gdovic ran the entire season, recorded a career-best third-place finish at Greenville-Pickens Speedway, other top fives at Richmond International Raceway, Langley Speedway, and Greensville-Pickens, and recorded top-tens in all but five races. With only one crash on the season, he finished seventh in season points.

2013 led to Gdovic's first win, at Greensville-Pickens. He also recorded a second at Richmond and a third at Bowman Gray Stadium, but three engine failures in a fourteen race season dropped Gdovic to tenth in series points. The team scaled back to part-time in 2014, with only one top ten finish and three crashes in eight races. While focusing on the Lamborghini Super Trofeo series in 2015, Gdovic made only one start, a 12th at Virginia International Raceway. Moving up to the Xfinity Series in 2016, Gdovic made a start while sharing his family ride with other drivers. He finished 16th at Mobile International Speedway.

Xfinity Series
Gdovic made his Xfinity Series debut in the O'Reilly Auto Parts 300 at Texas Motor Speedway on April 10, 2015, in the No. 55 Chevrolet Camaro for Viva Motorsports. He qualified 29th and finished 26th, four laps down. Gdovic would make two more starts in 2015 one for Viva Motorsports, at Richmond International Raceway, in which he finished 30th, and one for Precision Performance Motorsports who purchased Viva Motorsports equipment, at Watkins Glen International, where he finished 13th.

On April 16, 2016, Gdovic made his first Xfinity start of the year in the first-ever Xfinity heat/main event, the Fitzgerald Glider Kits 300 at Bristol.  He finished 14th in his heat and 18th in the main. He attempted four more races during the course of the season, finishing 21st twice and bringing sponsorship from Verizon Wireless.

Gdovic had plans to run full-time in the No. 46 Precision Performance Motorsports Chevrolet, a ride he shared part-time in 2016 with Anthony Kumpen and Jordan Anderson. However, the team did not attempt a race.

After not running any Xfinity Series races from 2017 to 2019, Gdovic announced a return to the series for the 2020 race at the Indianapolis Motor Speedway infield road course with Sam Hunt Racing.

Sports cars

Lamborghini Super Trofeo Series
After originally being introduced to sports car racing in a 2015 Lamborghini test with Mitchum Motorsports at Virginia International Raceway, Gdovic captured the Lamborghini Super Trofeo North American Series championship later that year. He also experimented in the NASCAR Whelen Euro Series that year. The following year, Gdovic moved up to the Huracan Super Trofeo Series and won three times on his way to a second-place points finish. In 2017, he earned an invite to a Lamborghini training camp in hopes of becoming a factory driver. Gdovic ran the 2017 24 Hours of Daytona with DAC Motorsports as part of the Huracan schedule. He ran the Dubai 24 Hour while in the country for the TCR Middle East Series. In 2017, Gdovic partnered with co-driver Dr Todd Snyder for the 2017 Super Trofeo North America Season driving with DAC Motorsports  In 2018, Gdovic continued in Super Trofeo with co-driver Shinya Michimi, winning at Road America and finishing fourth in points. Gdovic teamed with Conor Daly for the 2019 Super Trofeo North America season. The pairing won their first race together at Barber Motorsports Park. Gdovic won his first Super Trofeo North America race of 2020 at Virginia International Raceway in August.

TCR Middle East Series
Gdovic was the only American in the 2017 TCR Middle East Series, driving a Volkswagen Golf with his German race team. Gdovic won in the first weekend of racing, which was in Dubai. He came up a narrow second in the standings to Brit Josh Files but helped his team to the Teams' Classification Championship.

Personal life
Gdovic lent equipment to fellow K&N Pro Series competitor Ronnie Bassett Jr. in 2016 after Bassett's shop burned down.

Motorsports career results

NASCAR
(key)
(Bold – Pole position awarded by qualifying time. Italics – Pole position earned by points standings or practice time. * – Most laps led.)

Xfinity Series

K&N Pro Series East

Whelen Euro Series – Elite 1

Whelen Euro Series – Elite 2

 Season still in progress
 Ineligible for series points

ARCA Racing Series
(key) (Bold – Pole position awarded by qualifying time. Italics – Pole position earned by points standings or practice time. * – Most laps led.)

WeatherTech SportsCar Championship
(key)

24 Hours of Daytona

References

External links
 

NASCAR drivers
1992 births
People from Yorktown, Virginia
Living people
Racing drivers from Virginia
ARCA Menards Series drivers
24H Series drivers
24 Hours of Daytona drivers